La Neuve-Lyre is a commune in the Eure department in Normandy in northern France. It is located on the D830 road between Evreux and L'Aigle.

Population

See also
Communes of the Eure department

References

Communes of Eure